Abraham Savgrain was a French publisher in the early 17th century. He was located Rue St Jacques, in Paris. Among other books, he published:

 "Ad veritatem hermeticae medicinae stabiliendam", by Duchesne, Joseph, 1604
 "Récit de l'entrée solemnelle et remarquable faite à Rome, par Dom Philippe Francois Faxicura" ("Account of the solemn and remarkable entrance in Rome of Dom Philippe Francois Faxicura"), in 1616
 "Libre discovrs fait av roy, svr la conclvsion de la paix." Paris: Abraham Savgrain, 1516 [i.e., 1616].
 "Observations diverses de Lovyse Bovrgeois ditte Bovrsier Sage-femme de la Royne" by Boursier, Louise Bourgeois, 1617

17th-century French people
French book publishers (people)
Year of birth unknown
Year of death missing